Paul Burger (16 June 1877 – 14 October 1933) was a Belgian racing cyclist. He won the Belgian national road race title in 1901.

References

External links

1877 births
1933 deaths
Belgian male cyclists
Place of birth missing